German Yuryevich Volgin (17 March 1963 – 28 July 2014) was a professional ice hockey player who played in the Soviet Hockey League.  He played for the HC Spartak Moscow, Dynamo Riga, and HC Dynamo Moscow.

References

External links

1963 births
2014 deaths
Russian ice hockey players
Soviet ice hockey players
HC Spartak Moscow players
HC Dynamo Moscow players
Ratingen EC players
Deggendorfer SC players
Severstal Cherepovets players
Kutafin Moscow State Law University alumni